Landkreis Heydekrug (1818–1945) was an administrative territorial entity of East Prussia, located in Lithuania Minor. It was part of Regierungsbezirk Gumbinnen.

The seat was in Heydekrug (modern Šilutė). In 1913, Karkeln and surrounding inland towns (those south of the yellow line in the map) were administratively transferred to Kreis Niederung. After World War I, Landkreis Heydekrug and other areas north of the yellow line became part of Memel Territory administered by Lithuania.

From 1945 to 1990, the area belonged to the Soviet Union, the southern part to the Kaliningrad Oblast, and the northern part to the Lithuanian SSR. Today, the northern part belongs to Lithuania and the southern part belongs to the Slavsky District of the Kaliningrad Oblast, Russia.

Geography 
The district was in Prussian Lithuania, on the Curonian Lagoon. The nearest major cities were Memel and Tilsit.

Demographics 
The district had a Lithuanian majority, with a significant German minority.

References

Kaliningrad Oblast
Districts of East Prussia